The Squirrel River is a  tributary of the Kobuk River in the U.S. state of Alaska. It is a very clear, small arctic river flowing south from the foothills of Baird Mountains to where it meets the Kobuk River in the village of Kiana. From Kiana, the Kobuk flows southwest into Hotham Inlet of Kotzebue Sound on the Chukchi Sea.

The upper segment of the stream runs in a U molded, half-mile wide valley lying between 300-to 400-foot moving slopes. The lower area of stream has a rough track along the north bank that approaches some mining claims on Klery Creek.

See also
List of rivers of Alaska

References

Rivers of Northwest Arctic Borough, Alaska
Rivers of Alaska